Muhammad Hafidz bin Roshdi (born 13 November 1994) is a Malaysian actor and model. He is a former contestant of Hero Remaja 2011/12 with Fattah Amin, Syafiq Kyle and Saharul Ridzwan.

Early life
Hafidz Roshdi was born on 13 November 1994, in Shah Alam, Selangor. He is the eldest child of four siblings two young brothers and has one young sister.

Career
His participation in the competition made Hafidz the youngest contestant in Hero Remaja 2011/12.

Filmography

Film

TV series

Telemovies

Theatre

Web series

Advertisement

Awards and nominations

References

External links
 
 
 
 

1994 births
Living people
Malaysian Muslims
Malaysian people of Malay descent
People from Selangor
21st-century Malaysian male actors
Malaysian male actors
Malaysian male film actors
Malaysian male television actors
Malaysian television presenters
Malaysian male stage actors